Events in the year 1951 in Japan.

Incumbents
Emperor: Hirohito
Prime Minister: Shigeru Yoshida
Chief Cabinet Secretary: Katsuo Okazaki until December 26, Shigeru Hori
Chief Justice of the Supreme Court: Kōtarō Tanaka
President of the House of Representatives: Kijūrō Shidehara until March 10, Jōji Hayashi from March 13
President of the House of Councillors: Naotake Satō

Governors
Aichi Prefecture: Hideo Aoyagi (until 4 April); Mikine Kuwahara (starting 11 May)
Akita Prefecture: Kosaku Hasuike (until 4 April); Tokuji Ikeda (starting 30 April)
Aomori Prefecture: Bunji Tsushima 
Chiba Prefecture: Hitoshi Shibata 
Ehime Prefecture: Juushin Aoki (until 4 April); Sadatake Hisamatsu (starting 4 May)
Fukui Prefecture: Harukazu Obata 
Fukuoka Prefecture: Katsuji Sugimoto 
Fukushima Prefecture: Sakuma Ootake 
Gifu Prefecture: Kamon Muto 
Gunma Prefecture: Yoshio Iyoku
Hiroshima Prefecture: vacant (until 24 January); Hiroo Ōhara (starting 24 January)
Hokkaido Prefecture: Toshifumi Tanaka
Hyogo Prefecture: Yukio Kishida 
Ibaraki Prefecture: Yoji Tomosue 
Ishikawa Prefecture: Wakio Shibano 
Iwate Prefecture: Kenkichi Kokubun
Kagawa Prefecture: Masanori Kaneko 
Kagoshima Prefecture: Kaku Shigenari 
Kanagawa Prefecture: Iwataro Uchiyama 
Kochi Prefecture: Wakaji Kawamura
Kumamoto Prefecture: Saburō Sakurai 
Kyoto Prefecture: Atsushi Kimura 
Mie Prefecture: Masaru Aoki
Miyagi Prefecture: Kazuji Sasaki 
Miyazaki Prefecture: Tadao Annaka 
Nagano Prefecture: Torao Hayashi 
Nagasaki Prefecture: Sōjirō Sugiyama (until 26 May); Takejirō Nishioka (starting 26 May)
Nara Prefecture: Mansaku Nomura (until 14 April); Ryozo Okuda (starting 30 April)
Niigata Prefecture: Shohei Okada 
Oita Prefecture: Tokuju Hosoda 
Okayama Prefecture: Hirokichi Nishioka (until 30 March); Yukiharu Miki (starting 3 May)
Osaka Prefecture: Bunzō Akama 
Saga Prefecture: Gen'ichi Okimori (until 4 April); Naotsugu Nabeshima (starting 4 April)
Saitama Prefecture: Yuuichi Oosawa
Shiga Prefecture: Iwakichi Hattori 
Shiname Prefecture: Fujiro Hara (until 4 April); Yasuo Tsunematsu (starting 4 May)
Shizuoka Prefecture: Takeji Kobayashi (until 4 April); Toshio Saitō (starting 4 April)
Tochigi Prefecture: Juukichi Kodaira (until 1 April); Goro Abe (starting 4 April)
Tokushima Prefecture: Goro Abe 
Tokyo Prefecture: Seiichirō Yasui 
Tottori Prefecture: Aiji Nishio 
Toyama Prefecture: Kunitake Takatsuji 
Wakayama Prefecture: Shinji Ono 
Yamagata Prefecture: Michio Murayama 
Yamaguchi Prefecture: Tatsuo Tanaka 
Yamanashi Prefecture: Katsuyasu Yoshie (until 4 April); Hisashi Amano (starting 30 April)

Events

April 24 - Sakuragichō train fire
May 19 – According to Japan Fire and Disaster Management Agency official confirmed report, a fire in Ohara Cinema in Hamanaka, Hokkaido, the death toll number was 42.
July 11 – According to Japan Fire and Disaster Management Agency official confirmed report, a torrential heavy massive rain, affective Heiwa Lake collapsed in Kameoka, Kyoto Prefecture, killing 117 persons.
July 15 – According to National Police Agency of Japan official confirmed report, an extra bus plunge into Tenryu River, Urakawa Town, (now Tenryu-ku, Hamamatsu), Shizuoka Prefecture, official death toll is 28 persons. 
September 15 – An extreme Typhoon Ruth, a flood swept and landslide occur in Iwakuni area, Yamaguchi Prefecture, tidal wave hit in Satsunan Islands, according to Japanese government official confirmed report, in total 943 persons were killed, 2644 persons were wounded. 
November 3 – During a regular route bus running, following caught fire in Uno Town (now Seiyo), Ehime Prefecture, 33 persons were perished, according to NPAJ confirmed report.
Unknown date – Japan National Mutual Insurance Federation of Agricultural Corporatives (JA Kyosai) was founded.

Films
Early Summer

Births
January 8 – Yoshinori Monta, singer-songwriter 
February 5 – Ryūsei Nakao, actor, singer and voice actor
February 16 – Yumi Takigawa, actress
March 3 – Heizō Takenaka, economist
March 4 – Linda Yamamoto, pop star
April 8 – Kaori Momoi, actress
May 14 – Jumbo Tsuruta, professional wrestler (d. 2000)
May 15 – Yoshifumi Hibako, general
May 16 – Unshō Ishizuka, voice actor (d. 2018)
August 8 – Mamoru Oshii, film director
August 11 – Katsumi Chō, voice actor
October 7 – Natsuo Kirino, novelist and writer
October 8 – Maki Kaji, populariser of Sudoku (d. 2021)
November 5 – Mari Amachi, singer and actress
December 20 – Shigeru Suzuki, musician, songwriter and guitarist
December 26 – Ginzō Matsuo, voice actor (d. 2001)

Deaths
January 21 - Yuriko Miyamoto, novelist
March 10 - Kijūrō Shidehara, Prime minister of Japan
May 17 - Empress Teimei, Empress consort of Emperor Taishō
June 11 - Takuma Nishimura

See also
 List of Japanese films of 1951

References

 
1950s in Japan
Years of the 20th century in Japan